The 1985 Temple Owls football team was an American football team that represented Temple University as an independent during the 1985 NCAA Division I-A football season. In its third season under head coach Bruce Arians, the team compiled a 4–7 record and outscored opponents by a total of 233 to 223. The team played its home games at Veterans Stadium in Philadelphia. 

The team's statistical leaders included Lee Saltz with 1,875 passing yards, Paul Palmer with 1,516 rushing yards and 60 points scored, and Willie Marshall with 893 receiving yards.

Schedule

References

Temple
Temple Owls football seasons
Temple Owls football